Camp Tel Hai (Hebrew: מחנה תל חי makhane tel khai) was an early summer camp kvutza of the Chicago chapter of the Habonim youth movement and one of the first summer camps of Habonim in North America.  Founded in 1935 near New Buffalo, Michigan on the site of an old Farband summer camp that had been damaged by fire, Tel Hai operated for ten years before being destroyed by fire around 1945.

See also

 Habonim Dror

References
 "Review of Twenty-Five Years" in Adventures in Pioneering: Twenty-Five Years of Habonim Camping
"Midwest Camp Habonim" by Leonard Zurakov in Adventures in Pioneering: Twenty-Five Years of Habonim Camping

Tel Hai
Youth organizations based in Michigan
Jews and Judaism in Chicago
Zionist youth movements
Buildings and structures in Berrien County, Michigan
1935 establishments in Michigan
Jewish socialism
Child-related organizations in the United States
Zionism in the United States
Socialism in the United States
1940s disestablishments in Michigan